R-value or rvalue may refer to:
 R-value (insulation) in building engineering, the efficiency of insulation of a house
 R-value (soils) in geotechnical engineering, the stability of soils and aggregates for pavement construction
 R-factor (crystallography), a measure of the agreement between the crystallographic model and the diffraction data
 R0 or R number, the basic reproduction number in epidemiology
 In computer science, a pure value which cannot be assigned to
 In statistics, the Pearson product-moment correlation coefficient, or simply correlation coefficient
 In solid mechanics, the Lankford coefficient

See also 
 L-value (disambiguation)
 R rating (disambiguation)
 R-factor, a plasmid that codes for antibiotic resistance